Indiana Black Expo is a nonprofit organization headquartered in Indianapolis, Indiana, U.S. It is responsible for overseeing two of the state's largest cultural events: the Indiana Black Expo Summer Celebration, and the Circle City Classic.

Since 1983, Indiana Black Expo has hosted the Circle City Classic, a two-day event held the first weekend in October which includes a parade as well as its main attraction, a college football game held between two historically black colleges and universities (HBCUs).

References

Festivals in Indianapolis
African-American festivals
Non-profit organizations based in Indianapolis
African-American history of Indianapolis